A Little Happiness is the second studio album and the first album to be released from American pop/rock singer-songwriter Aimee Allen, released on July 21, 2009, by Side Tracked Records. The album generated the single, "On Vacation" (#49 Billboard Hot AC).  "Calling the Maker" is featured on Tap Tap Revenge 3.

Track listing

References

2009 albums
Aimee Allen albums